Roh Sang-rae (born 15 December 1970) is a South Korean retired footballer who played the majority of his professional career with the Jeonnam Dragons as a forward. He is currently manager of Jeonnam Dragons.

Club career
In his first season, 1995, Roh exploded onto the professional football scene with the Chunnam Dragons.  He achieved a triple crown, in that he was awarded the K League Rookie of the Year Award, was the highest domestic goalscorer, and featured in an All-star match MVP. He was also the top scorer in the Korean FA Cup 1997. In 1999, he was the Asian Cup Winners Cup MVP.

After eight season with the Dragons, for 2003, he transferred to new club Daegu FC for their inaugural season in the K-League.  Roh would play two seasons for Daegu (27 games in total), before retiring after a limited number of appearances in the 2004 season.

He is the fifth member of 40-40 Club as of 27 April 2003.  His record was 72 goals and 40 assists when he achieved this record in a game against Busan I'Park. His career record is 246 appearances, for 76 goals and 40 assists.

International career
Roh has featured for the national squad on a number of occasions between 1995 and 1997, earning a total of 25 caps.  Although he participated in a number of the qualifying games for the 1998 World Cup, he did not make the eventual World Cup squad.

International goals
Results list South Korea's goal tally first.

References

External links
 
 Roh Sang-rae – National Team stats at KFA 
 
 

1970 births
Living people
Association football forwards
South Korean footballers
South Korean football managers
South Korea international footballers
1996 AFC Asian Cup players
Jeonnam Dragons players
Daegu FC players
K League 1 players
Jeonnam Dragons managers
People from Gunsan